Conioselinum is a genus of flowering plant in the family Apiaceae, native to Eurasia and North America. Its species are erect perennial plants with deeply toothed compound leaves and umbels of white flowers. Plants of this genus are known commonly as hemlock-parsley.

Species
, Plants of the World Online accepted the following species:
Conioselinum acuminatum (Franch.) Lavrova
Conioselinum anthriscoides (H.Boissieu) Pimenov & Kljuykov
Conioselinum chinense (L.) Britton, Sterns & Poggenb.
Conioselinum longifolium Turcz.
Conioselinum mexicanum J.M.Coult. & Rose
Conioselinum morrisonense Hayata
Conioselinum nepalense Pimenov & Kljuykov
Conioselinum pseudoangelica (H.Boissieu) Pimenov & Kljuykov
Conioselinum pteridophyllum (Franch.) Lavrova
Conioselinum reflexum Pimenov & Kljuykov
Conioselinum scopulorum (A.Gray) J.M.Coult. & Rose
Conioselinum shanii Pimenov & Kljuykov
Conioselinum sinchianum (K.T.Fu) Pimenov & Kljuykov
Conioselinum smithii (H.Wolff) Pimenov & Kljuykov
Conioselinum tataricum Hoffm.
Conioselinum tenuisectum (H.Boissieu) Pimenov & Kljuykov
Conioselinum tenuissimum (Nakai) Pimenov & Kljuykov

References

External links 
 Jepson Manual Treatment
 USDA Plants Profile

Apioideae
Apioideae genera